Hadong Power Station is a large coal-fired power station in South Korea.

See also 

 List of coal power stations

References 

Coal-fired power stations in South Korea